Siquinalá is a town, with a population of 18,150 (2018 census), and a municipality in the Escuintla department of Guatemala. The population of the municipality is 22,968 (2018 census). The municipality is located 81 km from Guatemala City, situated between the municipalities of Escuintla, Santa Lucía Cotzumalguapa, and La Democracia, linked to Siquinalá by road, which continues to the sea at Sipacate, in the municipality of La Gomera.

The town holds an annual festival on November 25, in honor of Saint Catherine of Alexandria (Santa Catalina de Alejandria), which includes the election of a festival queen, games, sports, singing, and a fair.

References

Municipalities of the Escuintla Department